Gobind Sagar Lake is a reservoir situated in Una and Bilaspur districts of Himachal Pradesh, India. It is formed by the Bhakra Dam.

The reservoir is on the river Sutlej and is named in honour of Guru Gobind Singh, the tenth Sikh guru. One of the world's highest gravity dams, the Bhakra dam rises nearly 225.5 m above its lowest foundations. Under the supervision of the American dam-builder, Harvey Slocum, work began in 1955 and was completed in 1962. To maintain the water level, the flow of the river Beas was channelized to Gobind Sagar by the Beas-Sutlej link which was accomplished in 1976.

Location and other aspects 
The reservoir lies in the Bilaspur District and Una District. Bilaspur is about 91 km away from the Bhakra Dam. Its name given by Former Chairman of PSEB SardarJi Harbans Singh Somal, in honor of 10th Guru Gobind Singh Ji. In October and November, when the water level of the reservoir is high, a series of regattas are organised by the Tourism and Civil Aviation department.

Gobind Sagar was declared a water fowl refuge in 1962. Fishing is commonly practiced here. It has about fifty one species and sub species. Bangana dero, Tor putitora, Sperata seenghala and Mirror carp are some of the common species found here.

Water Sports
Govind Sagar Lake  reservoir in Una and Bilaspur Districts of Himachal Pradesh with its 56 km length and nearly 3 km breadth. It offers a variety of water-sports activities in close collaboration with the Directorate tourism and Civil Aviation and Directorate of Mountaineering and Allied Sports. Due to seasonal water level fluctuation, watersports are mainly confined to half of the year i.e. August to January. During this period the activities include swimming, surfing, water-skiing, kayaking, rowing, canoeing, white water river rafting.  Courses are conducted at three levels – beginners, intermediate and advance. For this Tourism Department of Himachal Pradesh has constructed a huge Water Sports Complex in Luhnu Ground, Bilaspur with all the boarding, lodging and equipment facilities. River rafting or white water rafting, as it is also called, is swiftly making Bilaspur a focus for this sport. Non swimmers and novices can also have this thrilling experience in an inflatable rubber dinghy, on some of the gentler rapids.

See also
Maharana Pratap Sagar
Pandoh Lake
Bhakra Dam

References

External links
 Gobing Sagar Lake

Lakes of Himachal Pradesh
Geography of Bilaspur district, Himachal Pradesh
Reservoirs in India
Memorials to Guru Gobind Singh